College Football USA 96 is a sports game released in 1995 by EA Sports. It is the follow-up to Bill Walsh College Football '95 and part of EA's NCAA Football series of games.  College Football USA 96 was the first in the series to feature all Division l-A teams (108 at the time) as well as the first to feature real bowl games (Orange, Sugar, Fiesta, and Rose). With Bill Walsh's retirement from coaching after the 1994 season, the game no longer carried an endorsement.

The game received praise for the large number of available teams and for being an accurate simulation of the sport.

Gameplay
Players could play an entire 11-game season (or shorter if desired) as any of the 108 selectable Division I-A  teams before advancing to one of the bowl games. College Football USA 96 would mark the first and only time that the Southwest Conference would appear in a video game because it would merge with the Big 8 to form the Big 12 the following year. It also marked the only time that the University of Pacific Tigers football team would appear in a video game, as they dropped their football program after the 1995 season to save money.

There were 400 plays from which to choose, and a new passing mode allowed players to select from five receivers on every play. Other new features and options included the following: four-player mode, three different game lengths, substitutions, injuries, audibles, fake snaps, spins, hurdles, dives, blocked kicks, interceptions, and laterals.

Reception
The game was well received by critics. GamePro called it "the most authentic and in-depth Genesis college football cart yet", citing the challenging A.I., the huge selection of teams, and the many new features and gameplay elements brought to the series. The two sports reviewers of Electronic Gaming Monthly gave it scores of 8.5 and 8 out of 10. They likewise praised the selection of teams and the new gameplay elements, and remarked that the game "brings another level in football gaming."

Next Generation reviewed the Genesis version of the game, rating it three stars out of five, and stated that "College football fans will love the complete teams and playbooks, but we're still waiting to see the new version of College Football National Championship from Sega before we pick a national champion."

Namio Noma for The Folsom Telegraph praised the game, saying that "overall, College Football USA '96 is yet another strong game from the sports experts at EA Sports.

References

1995 video games
College football video games
EA Sports games
Electronic Arts games
High Score Productions games
Multiplayer and single-player video games
NCAA video games
North America-exclusive video games
Sega Genesis games
Sega Genesis-only games
Video games developed in the United States